Fred Hechinger (born ) is an American actor. He is best known for playing Trevor in the coming-of-age film Eighth Grade, John Calley in the Western drama News of the World, and Ethan Russell in the psychological thriller The Woman in the Window. He also starred in The Fear Street Trilogy of horror films on Netflix and the first season of the HBO anthology series The White Lotus.

Early life
Hechinger was born in New York City to parents Sarah Rozen and Paul Hechinger. His grandfather was The New York Times education editor Fred M. Hechinger. He grew up on the Upper West Side and attended Saint Ann's School, where his classmates included fellow actors Lucas Hedges and Maya Hawke. Hechinger was a teen reporter and studied at Upright Citizens Brigade. He is Jewish.

Career 
In 2018, Hechinger made his acting debut as Trevor in the coming-of-age dramedy film Eighth Grade. The following year, he co-starred in Marc Meyers' drama film Human Capital, which is based on Stephen Amidon's 2004 novel of the same name. It premiered at the Toronto International Film Festival and later released through DirecTV Cinema on March 20, 2020.

In 2020, Hechinger starred in Paul Greengrass' Western film, News of the World, alongside Tom Hanks.

In 2021, he starred alongside Amy Adams in the Joe Wright-directed psychological thriller film The Woman in the Window; the movie had already been filmed prior to the COVID-19 pandemic.

He appeared as Simon Kalivoda in the Netflix horror films in The Fear Street Trilogy, which all the films were released in 2021. Hechinger's breakout role came through his main role performance as Quinn Mossbacher in the first season of HBO's The White Lotus, which was released at the same year.

Hechinger will next appear in the upcoming Sony's Spider-Man Universe film Kraven the Hunter, with Aaron Taylor-Johnson in the title role, scheduled to be released on October 6, 2023, in which he is due to portray Dmitri Smerdyakov / Chameleon.

Filmography

Film

Television

Music videos

References

External links

21st-century American male actors
American film actors
American male film actors
American male television actors
American people of German-Jewish descent
Jewish American male actors
Living people
Male actors from New York City
Saint Ann's School (Brooklyn) alumni
Upright Citizens Brigade Theater performers
Year of birth uncertain
Year of birth missing (living people)